Tarun Jain (born 18 May 1985) is an Indian writer, actor and entrepreneur. He is best known for writing Pyaar Ka Punchnama 2 and De De Pyaar De, as well as for creating, writing and acting in the Digital Sitcom Life Sahi Hai. He is also the founder of iForIndia.org, a social non-profit organisation created to push to greater self-governance and political accountability.

Career
Jain's first writing project was the sequel to 2011's surprise hit Pyaar Ka Punchnama. While writing Pyaar Ka Punchnama 2, he simultaneously launched iForIndia with Ankur Garg. iForIndia is a social non-profit aimed at driving accountability in Indian politics.

In 2016, Jain created, wrote and acted in the sitcom Life Sahi Hai

Filmography

Films

Web series

References

1985 births
Living people
Businesspeople from Delhi
Male actors from Delhi
St. Columba's School, Delhi alumni
University of Southern California alumni